Servants of Darkness is the third album by Swedish black metal band Nifelheim. It was released in 2000 on CD (first 1000 came with a slipcase), LP (only 1000 copies, 200 on golden vinyl) and on cassette by Rockor Disc in Romania.

Track listing
"Evil Blasphemies" – 3:17
"Sadistic Blood Massacre" – 2:50
"Black Evil" – 2:16
"The Bestial Avenger" – 5:17
"War of Doom (Armageddon)" – 4:16
"Servants of Darkness" – 3:50
"Infernal Desolation" – 3:27
"Into the Morbid Black" – 5:07
"Sacrifice to the Lord of Darkness" – 4:20

Personnel
Hellbutcher: vocals
Demon: lead and rhythm guitars
Tyrant: lead, rhythm and bass guitars
Devastator: drums, percussion

References
 
 

Nifelheim albums
2000 albums